Parliament Buildings in Nairobi is the seat of the Kenyan Parliament.

History 

The buildings were constructed in 1954 and the home of the colonial legislature of the Kenya Colony, the Legislative Council of Kenya, which sat there until 1963, when the council was replaced by the National Assembly. The buildings, known before 1963 as the "Legislative Buildings", were designed by prominent modernist architect, Amyas Connell, and the town planning advisor to the Kenyan Colonial Government, Harold Thornley Dyer. The Parliament has an English-style clocktower which was a design requirement to have the Legislative Buildings echo the Palace of Westminster and Big Ben.

Burials 

Jomo Kenyatta, Kenya's first prime minister, is buried on the estate.

References 

Seats of national legislatures
Government buildings completed in 1954
Buildings and structures in Nairobi
Government buildings in Kenya
National Assembly (Kenya)
Clock towers
Towers completed in 1954
1954 establishments in Kenya
Architecture in England